Francisc Boros (born 1906, date of death unknown) was a Romanian footballer who played as a striker.

International career
Francisc Boros played two matches for Romania, making his debut on 21 April 1929 under coach Constantin Rădulescu in a friendly which ended with a 3–0 victory against Bulgaria. His second game was a 3–2 loss in which he scored one goal against Yugoslavia at the 1929 King Alexander's Cup.

Honours
Colțea Brașov
Divizia A: 1927–28

References

External links
 

1906 births
Year of death missing
Romanian footballers
Romania international footballers
Place of birth missing
Association football forwards
Liga I players
FC Rapid București players